Sexual Preference: Its Development in Men and Women (1981) is a book about the development of sexual orientation by the psychologist Alan P. Bell and the sociologists Martin S. Weinberg and Sue Kiefer Hammersmith, in which the authors reevaluate what were at the time of its publication widely held ideas about the origins of heterosexuality and homosexuality, sometimes rejecting entirely the factors proposed as causes, and in other cases concluding that their importance had been exaggerated. Produced with the help of the American National Institute of Mental Health, the study was a publication of the Institute for Sex Research. Together with its  Statistical Appendix, Sexual Preference was the conclusion of a series of books including Homosexuality: An Annotated Bibliography (1972) and Homosexualities: A Study of Diversity Among Men and Women (1978), both co-authored by Bell and Weinberg.

Using data derived from interviews conducted in 1969 and 1970 with subjects in the San Francisco Bay Area, Bell et al. attempted to test explanations of sexual orientation put forward by psychoanalysts and social scientists. They found that while homosexual men were more likely than heterosexual men to have felt especially close to their mothers, this had almost no effect on the development of male homosexuality. Poor father-son relationships appeared to be weakly connected to male homosexuality. Homosexual women were more likely than heterosexual women to describe their relationships with their mothers as negative, and to have detached or hostile fathers, but only the latter factor seemed significant. In both sexes, but especially in men, homosexuality was connected to "Childhood Gender Nonconformity", which was a measure partly of behavior more typical of the opposite sex and partly of subjective feelings of masculinity and femininity. Sexual abuse and labeling by others played no significant role. Bell et al. concluded that psychoanalytic explanations of sexual orientation are inadequate. They suggested that while bisexuality may be subject to influence by social and sexual learning, the development of heterosexuality and homosexuality may have a biological basis, possibly influenced by hormonal factors. They hoped that demonstrating a biological basis to homosexuality would have beneficial effects such as increasing tolerance of gay people.

Seen as likely to provoke controversy even before its publication, Sexual Preference received considerable media attention, and mixed reviews. Critics questioned Bell et al.′s reliance upon a statistical technique, originally developed for use in the biological sciences, called path analysis, disputed the representativeness of their sample of homosexuals, pointed out the difficulty and potential unreliability of adult recall of childhood feeling and the vague and general nature of the questions respondents were asked, and disagreed with Bell et al.′s suggestion that sexual orientation is innate. Nevertheless, some reviewers complimented Sexual Preference for its authors' challenge to established views about the causes of homosexuality, and it eventually came to be considered a classic work. It is one of the most frequently cited retrospective studies relating to sexual orientation, credited by psychologists with disproving psychoanalytic theories about the development of homosexuality. It was the last study on homosexuality released by the Institute for Sex Research.

Summary

Overview of the study
Bell et al.′s objective was to test the explanations of how people become heterosexual or homosexual proposed by psychoanalysts and social scientists, including psychoanalytic theories attributing homosexuality to a failure to resolve Oedipal conflicts. In their view, theories about the origins of sexual orientation had usually not been rigorously tested prior to their study, partly because some of them, including those advanced by psychoanalysts, use concepts which are hard to "pin down and operationalize." They anticipated that psychologists and psychoanalysts would object to their work on methodological grounds, such as that no attempt was made to access unconscious material, or that the interviews, which lasted only a few hours, could never reveal what truly occurred in someone's childhood. They argued, however, that the fact that their data was not obtained from clinical sources was a strength, that attempting to access unconscious material risks selective interpretation of the data, and that "if the differences between homosexual and heterosexual patterns of development are really as great as psychoanalytic theory claims" then such differences would be reflected to at least some extent in the reports of their respondents.

Aware that some scholars might reject any view of the development of homosexuality resembling psychoanalytic theory, they noted that many of the variables used in their statistical analyses pertained to "experiences occurring outside our respondents′ original households", including relationships with peers, labeling by others, and sexual experiences. They added that it was not easy to answer objections to the use of retrospective data, given the unresolved issue of how accurate their respondents′ recollections of childhood were, and that even a longitudinal study would have been open to question. They observed that some gay rights activists might object to their study on principle, and suspect that they wanted to find a way to prevent homosexuality. However, they argued that ideas about the development of homosexuality contribute to prejudice against homosexuals, and that so long as heterosexuals accepted largely untested theories that see homosexuality as the result of a bad upbringing, their negative attitudes toward homosexuals would never change.

They considered their sample of homosexual adults more representative than those used in previous studies, and argued that examining blacks separately from whites, and men separately from women, helped them to determine the extent to which patterns of homosexual and heterosexual development depend on race and sex. They wrote that while Bell, a psychologist and therapist, was "relatively supportive of psychodynamic theory", Weinberg and Hammersmith were sociologists with a different outlook. They argued that their varying outlooks helped counteract bias. They did not believe that completing their study earlier would have altered their findings. Believing that familiarity with scientific theories about homosexuality might bias their respondents′ answers, they did not report results that could be explained through exposure to them. They used path analysis, a statistical technique originally developed for use in the biological sciences, to try to establish which factors were most important. It required dividing "the independent variables into sequential stages, according to the time when their influences are most likely to occur." The dependent variable they wanted to explain, adult sexual preference, went at the final stage.

Findings on white men
Bell et al. found that homosexual men were more likely than heterosexual men to have felt especially close to their mothers. Male respondents who were unusually close to their mothers were more likely to describe themselves as having been feminine children, but only a minority of boys with this kind of background became homosexual. Bell et al. concluded that male homosexuality is not the "result of an unusually strong maternal identification", and that mothers have only a small influence on their sons′ psychosexual development. Homosexual men were less likely to give positive descriptions of their fathers, but more likely to have negative feelings toward their fathers, to dislike, hate, or fail to feel close to them, or to consider them hostile or detached. They were also more likely to feel more similar to their mothers than to their fathers, or to prefer to be like their mothers. Bell et al. concluded that, "Unfavorable relationships with fathers" have a weak connection to "gender nonconformity and early homosexual experiences".

Few male respondents had engaged in childhood sex play, and it did not seem to be important in the development of homosexuality. Homosexual men were less likely to report having enjoyed boys' activities such as football and to see themselves as having been very masculine while growing up, but more likely to report having enjoyed stereotypical girls' activities. Three variables (dislike of typical boys' activities, enjoying typical girls' activities, and feelings of masculinity or femininity) were combined into a composite measure called "Childhood Gender Nonconformity", which proved to be the most important developmental variable. It appeared to make male respondents less likely to feel attraction to the opposite sex during childhood, but more likely to feel sexually different from other boys, experience homosexual arousal and activities, and become homosexual as adults. Homosexual men were more likely to recall having felt different from other boys their age, or to say that they felt different because they did not like sport, or because they were not interested in girls or were sexually interested in other boys. They were also more likely to report feeling different because they had stereotypical feminine traits or interests. Feeling different during childhood appeared to be irrelevant, but feeling different for gender reasons during adolescence had "modest total effects". Boys who felt sexually different were more likely to become homosexual as adults, whether they began to feel that way during childhood or adolescence. While homosexual men were more likely to have been labeled sexually different or homosexual before the age of 19, this apparently played no significant role in the development of sexual orientation.

Homosexual men tended to have had their first homosexual encounter at a younger age, and were more likely to have their first encounters with friends or acquaintances rather than strangers. The data did not support the idea that homosexual males are likely to have been seduced by older men. Homosexual activity involving genital contact in childhood was connected to adult homosexuality, though only weakly; homosexual arousal during childhood or adolescence was a stronger predictor of adult homosexuality. Heterosexual arousal during childhood was a moderate predictor of adult heterosexuality. Phenomena associated with sexual maturation, such as the age of first ejaculation, did not seem to be important, and neither did parental attitudes toward sex. Respondents' opportunities to engage in sex with persons of the opposite or the same sex did not seem to be an important influence on the sexual preference they developed, and sexual experiences with persons of both the same and the opposite sex were common among both homosexuals and heterosexuals. Sexual feelings appeared to be more important than sexual behavior as an indicator of adult sexual preference.

Findings on white women
Homosexual women were more likely to describe their relationships with their mothers as negative, and their mothers as having been hostile or rejecting. These measures were combined into a single measure, "Hostile-Rejecting Mother", which appeared to have only minimal influence on the development of sexual preference. Homosexual women were less likely to describe their mothers as having been pleasant people. This and two other connected variables were combined into a composite measure called "Unpleasant Mother", which had a weak and indirect connection with adult homosexuality. Homosexual women identified less strongly with their mothers, though this appeared to have very little influence on adult sexual preference, having only indirect effects, dependent upon its encouragement of childhood gender nonconformity. Homosexual women gave less favorable descriptions of their relationships with their fathers, and were more likely to have negative feelings toward them, and to describe them as having been hostile or detached. These variables were combined into a measure called "Detached-Hostile Father", which appeared to encourage childhood gender nonconformity and adolescent homosexual involvement. Homosexual women were less likely to identify with their fathers, but the "Identification with Father" variable appeared to be unimportant.

Few female respondents reported engaging in sex play with their siblings, and it seemed to have no role in the development of sexual preference. Homosexual women were less likely to report having enjoyed typical girls' activities, but more likely to report having enjoyed typical boys' activities, such as football, and to describe themselves as having been very masculine while they were growing up. These and other variables were combined into a "Childhood Gender Nonconformity" measure, which proved to be the second strongest predictor of homosexuality. Bell et al. noted, however, that childhood gender nonconformity did not seem to have been important in the way proposed by psychoanalytic theory, in that it was not a crucial link between family influences and their respondents' sense of womanhood, and nor was it explained by relationships within the family. Homosexual women were more likely to recall having felt different from other girls their age during grade school and high school years, and to say that they felt different because they were more masculine than other girls, more interested in sports, or not interested in boys. Homosexual women were also more likely to have felt sexually different. However, these feelings did not appear to play a role in the development of female homosexuality. Homosexual women, unlike heterosexual women, were sometimes labeled sexually different or homosexual before the age of 19, but such labeling also appeared to play no significant role in the development of female homosexuality.

Homosexual arousal in childhood appeared to predict adult homosexuality, while homosexual activities and arousal during adolescence had a very strong connection with adult homosexuality. Rape and sexual molestation did not appear to be significant in the development of homosexuality. Heterosexual arousal during childhood had a very small effect on adult sexual preference. Homosexual women were more likely to have their first homosexual encounter before their first heterosexual encounter. Phenomena associated with physical maturation, such as the age at which menstruation began, did not appear to play a significant role in the development of sexual preference, while parental attitudes toward sex and failure to enjoy early heterosexual activity also seemed unimportant. Sexual feelings seemed important in the development of adult homosexuality.

Findings on blacks
The results for black men were in general the same as those for white men, except that while the "Identification with Father" variable had some significance for white men, it had none for black men, and whereas for white men pre-adult sexual feelings were important in the development of adult homosexuality, childhood and adolescent sexual activities were important for black men. Bell et al. suggested that this finding could show that black males became homosexual due to their early homosexual activities, which was consistent with a learning theory interpretation, but that alternatively it might reflect "the freer sexual attitude of the black community", which could have allowed their black respondents to act on their sexual inclinations at an earlier age than their white respondents. The findings for black women were very similar to those for white women.

Conclusions
Bell et al. rejected many accepted ideas about the development of homosexuality. They concluded that psychodynamic theories exaggerate the role of parents in the development of their sons' sexual orientation, and that the psychoanalytic model that attributes male homosexuality to dominant mothers and weak fathers is inadequate. They found the idea that "cold, detached" fathers and poor father-son relationships predispose boys toward homosexuality more plausible, but emphasized that these factors have only an indirect connection to sexual preference. They suggested that relationships with parents might play a greater role in the development of female homosexuality, although they found having a cold or distant father less significant as a cause of female than of male homosexuality. They also rejected sociological theories such as the idea that homosexuality results from labeling by others. Overall, they concluded that sexual preference is likely to be already determined by the time boys and girls reach adolescence, and that there is a powerful link between gender nonconformity and the development of homosexuality in both sexes, but especially in men. Although stressing that their model "applies only to extant theories and does not create new ones", they wrote that they had identified "a pattern of feelings and reactions within the child that cannot be traced back to a single social or psychological root".

Different kinds of homosexuals were compared. The "Identification with Father" variable appeared to be important in the development of homosexuality among effeminate white homosexual men. Bell et al. noted that failure to identify with the father might encourage effeminacy, but that it was also possible that boys who were effeminate for other reasons might find it difficult to identify with their fathers. Pre-adult homosexual behavior was more important among men who were not effeminate. Bell et al. suggested that for effeminate males early homosexual feelings were the only important predictor of adult homosexuality, while other males were influenced by a combination of homosexual feelings and other factors. They found that sexual preference was much less strongly connected with pre-adult sexual feelings for white bisexual men than it was for white homosexual men. They concluded that exclusive homosexuality tends to emerge from a "deep-seated predisposition" but that bisexuality is "more subject to influence by social and sexual learning."

Exclusively homosexual white men tended to report that they had not identified with their fathers, but there was no significant tendency for white bisexual men not to identify with their fathers. Only white homosexual men who had undergone psychotherapy had "paternal variables" that were consistent with what clinicians had considered typical of homosexual males. Among whites, gender nonconformity appeared to be important in the development of homosexuality among masculine homosexual women, but not among homosexual women who were not masculine, while adolescent homosexual involvement was important for non-masculine homosexual women but not masculine homosexual women. Bisexual women appeared to be more influenced by involvement in homosexual genital activities in childhood than exclusively homosexual women, but unlike exclusively homosexual women, their homosexual preference did not appear related to inability to experience heterosexual arousal in childhood. Childhood gender nonconformity appeared more significant for exclusively homosexual women than for bisexual women, and more significant for women who had been in psychotherapy than for women who had not.

Bell et al. briefly reviewed the ideas of Sigmund Freud, the founder of psychoanalysis, the physician Havelock Ellis, and the psychiatrist Richard von Krafft-Ebing. They wrote that while there was an ongoing debate over the origins of homosexuality, there is evidence supporting the view that homosexuality has a biological basis, and that hormonal factors could be involved. They could not explain how sexual preference might be related to biology, but considered their findings consistent with what one would expect to find if it had a biological basis. They suggested that biological factors have a more powerful influence on exclusive homosexuals than on bisexuals, and that if there is a biological basis to homosexuality, it accounts for gender nonconformity as well as sexual orientation. They also proposed that the "familial factors commonly thought to account for homosexuality" may actually result from the way parents react to their prehomosexual children. They argued that demonstrating that homosexuality is biologically innate would lead to greater social tolerance, and help to relieve parents of gay people of guilt. They expressed hope that researchers would eventually produce more definitive answers about the origins of homosexuality.

Background and publication history
Together with its separately published Statistical Appendix, Sexual Preference was the concluding volume of a series of books including Homosexuality: An Annotated Bibliography (1972) and Homosexualities: A Study of Diversity Among Men and Women (1978), both authored jointly by Bell and Weinberg. The study was supported by the United States National Institute of Mental Health, Indiana University, the Institute for Sex Research, and the Glide Foundation. Persons assisting the study included the gay rights activists Del Martin and Phyllis Lyon, the sociologists John Gagnon and William Simon, and the anthropologist Paul Gebhard. Bell wrote that in the study he had "borrowed heavily from the psychodynamic view of sexual development", while his sociologist co-authors had ensured that the study's data could be used to evaluate conditioning and labeling theory.

The study's data were derived from interviews conducted in 1969 and 1970 with "979 homosexual and 477 heterosexual men and women living in the San Francisco Bay Area." Homosexuals were recruited from a variety of locations while heterosexuals were obtained through random sampling. The interview schedule included approximately 200 questions. Most offered respondents a limited number of possible answers, though some allowed respondents to answer as they wished. Bell et al. maintained that since most of their heterosexual respondents were exclusively heterosexual, and most of their homosexual respondents predominantly or exclusively homosexual, the classification of respondents into heterosexuals and homosexuals represented "a natural division".

Sexual Preference was first published in 1981 by Indiana University Press. The same year, Bertelsmann published the book in German translation as Der Kinsey Institut Report über sexuelle Orientierung und Partnerwahl.

Reception

Mainstream media
Prior to its publication, Jane E. Brody wrote in The New York Times that Sexual Preference was likely to cause controversy because of its findings and its reliance on path analysis and its subjects' memories. Brody noted that path analysis could be misused and that it "can only explore existing notions, not create new ones." According to Brody, Bell said that he expected the study to be condemned by both "radical gays" and psychoanalysts, the psychologist John Paul De Cecco questioned the "theoretical basis" of Sexual Preference and the reliability and validity of relying on recollections of childhood, and the psychoanalyst Irving Bieber described Bell et al.′s findings as inconsistent with his clinical experience. Sexual Preference attracted considerable media attention in 1981, receiving positive reviews from the historian Paul Robinson in Psychology Today and Richard P. Halgin in Library Journal, a negative review from the sociologist John Gagnon in The New York Times, a notice in Newsweek, and a discussion in The Chronicle of Higher Education, which focused on the controversy surrounding the book. The following year, the book received a negative review from Michael Ignatieff in the London Review of Books. The work was faulted for the questionable representativeness of its sample of homosexuals, but those who reviewed it positively praised it for the sophistication of its path analysis.

Robinson suggested that Bell et al. might have misidentified gender nonconformity as a cause of homosexuality, rather than as one of its expressions, but nevertheless found Sexual Preference to be a "superb" book that answered the question of how people become heterosexual or homosexual better than any previous study, disqualified most previous answers, and was comparable to Alfred Kinsey's best work. He maintained that their study's empirical foundation and path analysis gave Bell et al.′s findings "unprecedented trustworthiness". Robinson credited Bell et al. with documenting the "intellectual poverty" of psychoanalytic hypotheses about homosexuality. He lamented that unlike Sexual Behavior in the Human Male (1948) and Sexual Behavior in the Human Female (1953), which gained popular attention, Sexual Preference "seems destined for academic oblivion." Halgin wrote that the book would be considered a landmark publication in sexology, and was more scientifically rigorous than most research in the field, but that it was also likely to create controversy.

Gagnon considered Sexual Preference a politically motivated study that would inevitably be received as a political and moral statement. He noted that its authors' conclusion that the lack of correlation between sexual orientation and early family experience means that the development of heterosexuality and homosexuality must be based on a biological predisposition was controversial. He criticized their use of path analysis, arguing that it over-emphasized differences between heterosexual and homosexual patterns of development. He also wrote that their reliance on adult recall of early childhood feeling was inconsistent with all recent research on memory, suggesting that respondents' answers to the vague and general questions employed in the study might reflect a subsequent reconstruction of events rather than an accurate recall of childhood. He also criticized their decision to group together "the respondents' observations relating to certain behaviors and attitudes", and their failure to provide new biological evidence. Ignatieff wrote that even if Bell et al.′s conclusion that family upbringing and factors such as labeling have little measurable effect on adult sexual orientation was correct it would not justify their additional claim that homosexuality is biologically innate, and that they had not resolved the question of how responsible people are for their sexual orientation.

In 2002, The New York Times quoted the historian and gay rights activist Martin Duberman as saying that Sexual Preference resulted from "the most ambitious study of male homosexuality ever attempted", and that together with Homosexualities it helped to "refuted a large number of previous studies" identifying gay men as "social misfits".

Gay media
Sexual Preference received a positive review from Robert Herron in Christopher Street and a mixed review from George Smith in The Body Politic, while in The Advocate it received a note from the editor and mixed reviews from the biologist Doug Futuym and the social scientist Richard Wagner.

Herron credited Bell et al. with disproving mistaken ideas about the causes of homosexuality and described it as a "massively impressive achievement". However, he criticized the authors for their use of the term "sexual preference" and for failing to define "homosexuality". He also believed that they should have stated unambiguously, instead of simply suggesting, that homosexuality is innate, and maintained that as social scientists, they could not properly assess research on biological influences on homosexuality. Smith considered the study useful for its challenge to established views about the causes of homosexuality. However, he was unconvinced by its conclusion that homosexuality has a biological basis and found its account of the subject remote from real experience. Smith argued that while Bell et al.′s  path analysis suggested that various variables cause one another, this was "an illusion created by statistical manipulation", and concluded that their category of "Gender Nonconformity" was a construct created by the researchers.

The Advocate wrote that the study had received media attention for its findings that sexual orientation is not determined by parenting and may have a biological basis. It described it as "the major report on homosexuality in 1981", and noted that for budgetary reasons it was likely to be the last report on homosexuality from the Institute for Sex Research.

Futuym wrote that the book had received attention from the media because of its authors' suggestion that homosexuality may have biological causes. However, he believed that they failed to demonstrate this and that other aspects of the book were more important. He noted that it was subject to criticism on the grounds that its sample of homosexuals was unrepresentative and that its subjects may have distorted their accounts of their childhoods by making them conform to their present views of themselves, and that its path analysis was open to question, and criticized its authors for failing to explain the operations of "childhood gender nonconformity". He observed that while they argued that sexual orientation might be biological because of the lack of any apparent psychosocial causes for it, it was possible that there were psychosocial causes that they had failed to investigate and that might operate early in life. He argued that a study such as theirs would be able to identify the causes of sexual orientation only if the causes were "few and very strong." However, he believed they deserved credit for showing that there was no support for the "standard psychosocial theories" or the belief that homosexuality is caused by seduction.

Wagner credited Bell et al. with distancing themselves from medical and psychiatric hostility to homosexuality, but criticized them for failing to conclude that searching for causes of homosexuality is misconceived. He believed that the media had wrongly interpreted their study as showing that homosexuality has a biological basis. He described their path analysis approach as a "complex theoretical model", and predicted that it would be a long time before it and its associated data could be "tested by the scientific community." Nevertheless, he considered the approach open to question, arguing that it was doubtful whether causal models could explain the development of sexual preference.

Scientific and academic journals, 1981–1982
Sexual Preference received a positive review from J. Kenneth Davidson, Sr. in the Journal of Marriage and Family, mixed reviews from the sociologist John DeLamater in Science and the sex researcher James D. Weinrich in The Quarterly Review of Biology, and negative reviews from the psychologist Clarence Tripp in the Journal of Sex Research and the sociologist Ira Reiss in Contemporary Sociology. The book was also discussed by DeCecco in the Journal of Sex Research and Bell in Siecus Report. Criticisms made of the work included that its authors' conclusions were based on an unrepresentative or dubiously representative sample of homosexuals, and that their reliance on path analysis and adult recall of early childhood feeling was problematic.

Davidson wrote that Bell et al. were aware that their work would be criticized on methodological grounds, and that they carefully addressed potential criticisms. He suggested that media reports had distorted their views about the possibility than homosexuality has a biological basis, writing that they acknowledged that their study did not provide the data to resolve this issue. Although he considered it regrettable that it took them more than a decade to publish their analysis of their study's data, and believed it was "directed more toward the lay reader than to the professional community", he found their work valuable for its exploration of the possible biological basis of homosexuality.

DeLamater believed that Sexual Preference benefited from Bell et al.′s "eclectic theoretical basis", which drew from the psychodynamic model, social learning theory, sociological models that emphasize the importance of peer relationships, and labeling theory. However, while he accepted their claim that their study was methodologically superior to prior work on homosexuals, he still found it problematic for many reasons and hesitated to endorse its conclusions. In his view, the path analysis involved "arbitrary classification and sequencing of variables". Weinrich wrote that while Bell et al. had a "more than adequate sample size", the sample had at times been broken down into smaller groups, and some of their conclusions about those groups had to be considered tentative. Weinrich concluded that they effectively challenged environmental theories of sexual orientation, and that attempts by critics to dismiss their conclusions about such theories were unsuccessful. He based this conclusion partly on personal communication with Hammersmith, however, noting that they did not explain their procedures for verifying their findings well in Sexual Preference and its statistical appendix. He also suspected that they had relied on dubious information from heterosexuals about the sexual orientation of their siblings, and considered their review of evidence on the possible biological basis of homosexuality inadequate.

Tripp wrote that Sexual Preference would likely be seen as "a shock and a disappointment", since its authors abandoned or misrepresented many of Kinsey's methods and conclusions. He criticized them for ignoring Kinsey's warning to make careful observations and "avoid theory", and for attempting to test the validity of psychoanalytic theories, which he considered already discredited by professionals. While he nevertheless believed that they had rendered a valuable service by showing that psychoanalytic theories are unsupported, he rejected their argument that since psychoanalytic ideas are incorrect the origins of sexual orientation must be genetic and hormonal, noting that in order to draw that conclusion they had to ignore the work of sex researchers such as Frank Beach. He also accused them of citing low quality and unreplicated hormone studies, ignoring evidence relating homosexuality to early puberty, and replacing inductive with deductive methods. In the same issue, they replied to Tripp, accusing him of misrepresenting their data analysis and their conclusions and making "ridiculous criticisms" of the scientific method they had employed. Tripp responded in a later issue, accusing them of making personal attacks, and attempting to refute them on specific points.

Reiss concluded that Sexual Preference helped suggest "the likely worth of ideas", but that given its shortcomings there was no way in which its authors could definitively resolve the issues they explored, despite their claim to "once and for all" discredit some ideas about homosexuality. He wrote that the study employed questions that were "vague" and "open-ended", and that its authors had an "arbitrary and rigid conception" of what could be done with their data, lacked "theoretical development" in its handling, and deliberately minimized the importance of the predictor variables they used to test psychoanalytic and other theories. He found their conclusion that sexual orientation has a biological basis unconvincing.

De Cecco dismissed both Sexual Preference and Bell and Weinberg's previous study Homosexualities, writing that while their authors presented them as definitive, they suffered from the "theoretical blindness" that has dominated research on homosexuality in the United States since the early 1970s. He contrasted Bell and Weinberg's work unfavorably with that of European thinkers whom he credited with "provocative theoretical speculations": the philosophers Michel Foucault and Guy Hocquenghem, the gay rights activist Mario Mieli, the sexologist Martin Dannecker, and the sociologist Jeffrey Weeks. Bell wrote that he was astonished by his finding that "parent-child relationships" are less influential in the development of sexual orientation than has often been thought. He related his findings to the theme of androgyny.

Scientific and academic journals, 1983–1986
Cheryl L. Gillespie gave Sexual Preference a mixed review in Family Relations. She commended Bell et al. for using a sophisticated methodology and trying to avoid "poorly designed measures and biased interpretation of data". Nevertheless, she found their methodology and interpretation of data open to question, writing that although their San Francisco Bay Area sample was arguably non-representative, they wrote as though the study was representative of the larger population, that they did not sufficiently explore the issue of bias in their subjects' self-reports, which might have been motivated by the subjects' ideology or desire to please the researchers by telling them what they thought they wanted to hear, and that they relegated the fact that respondents who had been exposed to scientific information regarding homosexuality were more likely to characterize their parents in accord with psychoanalytic models of emotionally absent fathers and domineering mothers to a footnote. She also suggested that readers might find Sexual Preference boring. Thomas Ford Hoult argued in the Journal of Homosexuality that Bell et al.′s conclusion that childhood gender nonconformity and adult sexual orientation have a biological basis is a legitimate hypothesis, but one that it is not confirmed by their failure to find a direct connection between sexual orientation and parent-child interaction.

Jeanne Marecek gave Sexual Preference a negative review in Sex Roles, writing that it was tedious and succeeded well neither as a popular book nor as a scientific treatment of its topic. She maintained that it lacked "methodological detail", and that its true focus was homosexuality rather than sexual preference generally. She believed that there were many problems with "the premises and the execution" of the study, writing that its authors neither broke "new theoretical ground" nor offered "a critical reading of old theories" and ignored questions such as "how and why adults change their sexual preference, what meanings individuals ascribe to their sexuality, and how social context contributes to stability or change in sexual preference". In her view, other problems included their failure to critically examine "the accuracy of the retrospective memories" of their respondents and willingness to take their answers to questions at face value. She concluded that they must have been disappointed by the results of their path analyses since, "Very few of the respondents' reported early experiences were related to the emergence of homosexuality." She disagreed with their focus on theories relating homosexuality to childhood experience and their conclusion that "sexual preference is dictated by developmental experiences", and wrote that they seemed politically conservative despite presenting themselves as liberals.

The psychoanalyst Gerard J. M. van den Aardweg criticized Bell et al.′s interpretation of their data in the American Journal of Psychotherapy. He argued that too many studies suggest that domineering mothers play a role in the development of male homosexuality for their conclusion that mothers have at most a weak influence on the development of their sons' sexual orientation to be readily acceptable, that all questionnaire studies have inherent limitations, and that their data are inferior to those collected over time by psychotherapists. He suggested that homosexuals might give defensive answers due to not wanting to be labelled abnormal, that Bell et al.′s data were of poor quality, since too few questions about parental behavior had been asked and open-ended questions yielded superficial answers, and that it was unjustified to conclude that parents must have only a small influence on the development of their children's sexual orientation simply because that influence did not reveal itself clearly. He accused Bell et al. of admitting the limitations of path analysis only to then ignore those limitations, arguing that the technique had "numerous dubious premises" and that they used it in a way that was open to technical objections such as its failure to "distinguish between different types of psychodynamic development to homosexuality". He considered them mistaken to treat their variables as isolated items, rather than in combination with each other. He also found the studies they cited as evidence that homosexuality might have a hormonal basis unconvincing.

The psychologists Paul H. Van Wyk and Chrisann S. Geist wrote in the Archives of Sexual Behavior that Bell et al. question a scientific consensus, established by researchers such as the psychologists Heino Meyer-Bahlburg and John Money, that biological factors have at most only a predisposing influence on the development of sexual orientation. Using their subject pool, which consisted of people interviewed between 1938 and 1963, they produced similar results. However they suggested that some significant differences could have been partly a result of the different methodology employed. In their view, the most important difference was that their outcome variable was based only on "overt behavior" whereas that of Bell et al. "is an average of subjective preference and overt behavior." They noted that Bell et al. "excluded from their model variables that did not apply to everyone in their sample", which made it impossible to judge the effects of "idiosyncratic and unique sexual and nonsexual experiences". The philosopher Michael Ruse credited Bell et al. with avoiding the problems of earlier studies, such as Bieber et al.′s Homosexuality: A Psychoanalytic Study of Male Homosexuals (1962), in Behavioral and Brain Sciences.

Scientific and academic journals, 1987–1996
De Cecco wrote in the Journal of Sex Research that Sexual Preference had no independent theoretical basis because it was conceived as an attempt to disprove theories viewing homosexuality as a mental or social pathology, and that Bell et al. were mistaken to conclude that, because such theories are incorrect, sexual orientation must be innate. He accused them of being motivated by "a misguided compassion for homosexuals", arguing that such compassion is actually a form of arrogance.

The philosopher Frederick Suppe described Sexual Preference as very important study in the Journal of Homosexuality. He wrote that it failed to duplicate the findings of Bieber et al. or the predictions of symbolic interactionism, labeling theory, and societal reaction theory approaches. He considered its sample of homosexuals, while highly biased, to nevertheless be the most representative ever made, and argued that biased samples can be adequate for the purposes of refuting theories propounded in other studies "so long as the types of subjects used in those other studies constitute a subsample of the replicative study′s sample and the latter's population does not go beyond the claimed scope of the replicated studies." He maintained that Bell et al.′s study meets these requirements, that their use of path analysis was appropriate, and that their procedures for developing a composite etiology model, which contained "virtually all paths advanced in the literature", are legitimate. He argued that the only plausible basis for disputing that the study definitively refutes "social learning theories of homosexual etiology" is to challenge the adequacy of its authors' models and the questions they employed. However, he criticized the questions asked. He wrote that while Bell et al. did not use the same specific questions that Bieber et al. had employed, they did use "questions directed at the same concerns." He noted that their data regarding subjects′ negative feelings toward and relationships with their fathers were based on open-ended interview questions, adding that it would have been preferable had they employed the same "structured-answer questions" used in Bieber et al.′s earlier study. He rejected their claim that their study supports a biological explanation of sexual orientation. He wrote that since their study, research into the "social causes of homosexuality" has become "moribund."

The social psychologist Daryl Bem credited Bell et al. with providing the most important data concerning "experience-based theories" of the development of sexual orientation in Psychological Review. This included "the classical psychoanalytic account", as well as views that attribute the origins of sexual orientation to learning, conditioning, seduction, or labeling. According to Bem, their finding that "no family variables" are "strongly implicated in the development of sexual orientation for either men or women" is "consistent with accumulating evidence that family variables account for much less of the environmental variance in personality than previously thought". He proposed a hypothesis, which he referred to as "Exotic becomes erotic", according to which children feel different from either their same-sex peers or opposite-sex peers and therefore eroticize them, leading to homosexuality and heterosexuality respectively. He referred to Bell et al.′s finding that gay men and lesbians were significantly more likely to recall having felt different from same-sex children during the grade-school years, and to other studies that drew similar conclusions. He maintained that Bell's view that people become erotically attracted to those who are different from them out of a "quest for androgyny" does not accurately characterize or explain the data, and rejected Bell et al.′s conclusion that sexual orientation is innate.

Scientific and academic journals, 1997–present
Letitia Anne Peplau et al. wrote in a critique of Bem's "exotic becomes erotic" hypothesis published in Psychological Review that Bell et al. recruited heterosexuals and homosexuals through non-comparable methods, and that while it is unknown how this and the retrospective nature of their data affected their findings, "they may have exaggerated the extent of true differences between heterosexual and homosexual respondents." Peplau et al. argued that Bell et al.′s data does not support Bem's hypothesis. Bem, in a defense of his hypothesis published in the same issue of Psychological Review, wrote that in their path analysis Bell et al. engaged in "an unfortunate dichotomization of the dependent variable, sexual orientation ... grouping the bisexual and homosexual respondents into the same category." In his view, while this procedure "might have seemed reasonable on a priori grounds ... it should have been abandoned as soon as the researchers saw the results of their own subanalyses, which made it clear that the bisexual respondents were not only very different from their exclusively homosexual counterparts but actually were more like the heterosexual respondents in theoretically critical ways." He argued that by grouping together the bisexuals and homosexuals Bell et al. "reduced many of the correlations and increased the likelihood that important antecedent variables would be erroneously eliminated during the recursive process of discarding the weaker correlates from successive iterations of the path model."

Peplau et al. wrote in the Annual Review of Sex Research that while Bell et al.′s suggestion that biological factors have a stronger influence on exclusive homosexuality than they have on bisexuality may seem plausible, it has not been directly tested and appears to conflict with available evidence, such as that concerning prenatal hormone exposure. The psychologist Bruce Rind credited Bell et al. with disproving psychoanalytic theories about the development of homosexuality, along with the idea that childhood seduction causes homosexuality, in the Archives of Sexual Behavior. The psychologist Mark Yarhouse wrote in the Archives of Sexual Behavior that Sexual Preference relies on retrospective memory recall, which can be unreliable. The psychologist J. Michael Bailey and his co-authors described Sexual Preference as a "landmark study" that "seemingly disposed of the idea that homosexuality resulted from the quality of parent-child relationships" in Psychological Science in the Public Interest.

Other evaluations, 1981–1987

The gay rights activist Dennis Altman noted that Bell et al.′s conclusion that there is a powerful link between gender nonconformity and the development of homosexuality depended on the memories of their respondents, who were likely to have been influenced by social expectations about how homosexuals should conform to gender roles. He observed that Bell et al.′s data was collected in 1969 and 1970, prior to the "growth of the modern gay movement and the development of the macho style among gay men", and criticized them for confusing "social roles with what is inborn", thereby underestimating the extent to which masculinity and femininity are social constructs. The psychologist William Paul and the sex researcher Weinrich maintained that Sexual Preference documented social diversity well and was the largest study conducted specifically on homosexuality, but that it was limited by the problems Bell et al. encountered in trying to obtain a representative sample. They suggested that because Bell et al. collected their data in 1969, they may have missed "cultural developments in the gay younger generation of the late 1960s and early 1970s." The gynecologist William Masters, the sexologist Virginia E. Johnson and the physician Robert C. Kolodny suggested that Sexual Preference was probably the most extensive study of homosexuality and maintained that it provided no support for Bieber's theory of homosexuality. Daniel Rancour-Laferriere credited Bell et al. with helping to support the idea that adult sexual preference has a biological basis, and with showing that a biological basis for homosexuality probably accounts for gender nonconformity as well as sexual orientation. He endorsed their view that the unfavorable relationships homosexual men tend to have with their fathers could be as likely to result from "the homosexual predisposition" of the child as the father's behavior.

Weeks described Sexual Preference as "the Kinsey Institute's final publication on homosexuality". He suggested that like sociobiologists and others who have attempted to find a biological explanation for social behavior Bell et al. had an "urge to fill a conceptual gap" stronger than their "adherence to theoretical consistency and political judgment". He wrote that while Bell et al. carefully explored the evidence for the aetiology of homosexuality, unlike Kinsey they failed to consider that homosexuality might not be a single phenomenon with a single explanation. He criticized them for concluding that if a social or psychological explanation of homosexuality cannot be found then a biological explanation must exist, deeming the argument "a rhetorical device" that results in "an intellectual closure which obstructs further questioning." The sociologists Frederick L. Whitam and Robin Mathy criticized Bell et al. for reporting mainly on their white subjects.

The sexologist Richard Green described Sexual Preference as one of several studies, including Bieber et al.′s Homosexuality: A Psychoanalytic Study of Male Homosexuals, to have found strained relationships between fathers and homosexual sons. He added that an unresolved question in such studies is what percent of heterosexuals give answers more typical of homosexuals and what percent of homosexuals give answers more typical of heterosexuals, and that such "contradictory" outcomes require explanation.

Other evaluations, 1988–1989
The psychoanalyst Richard C. Friedman maintained that despite the differing perspectives of their authors, the studies by Bell et al. and Bieber et al. were "in basic agreement with regard to childhood gender identity / gender role abnormalities in pre-homosexual children." He considered Bell et al.′s claim that path analysis made it possible to give each influence on homosexuality a particular weight at a particular time of childhood development unlikely, since retrospective methods cannot be converted to prospective methods. He wrote that the meaning of data depends on the models used to interpret them, and that Bell et al.′s models differ from those accepted by "psychodynamically oriented investigators."

The sociologist Miriam M. Johnson described Bell et al.′s study as the "largest, best-designed, and one of the least heterosexist investigations" of the development of sexual preference. In her view, its only possible bias is that because of its nature and San Francisco location "activist" homosexuals were over-represented. Johnson argued that "this bias would probably work against finding support for any hypotheses concerning parental influences, because activist homosexuals have ordinarily been opposed to psychoanalytic speculations about parental involvements." Johnson concluded, however, that the study's credibility was enhanced by the fact that Bell et al. took into account whether their respondents had been exposed to books or articles about the etiology of homosexuality, and disregarded results when they could be explained by such exposure. Johnson credited Bell et al. with showing that "almost all the alleged causes of adult sexual orientation are either nonexistent or highly exaggerated", but considered their claim that they had refuted psychoanalytic theories that attribute homosexuality to an unresolved Oedipus complex only "half true", given the father findings.

Ruse observed that Bell et al.′s findings about the parental backgrounds of heterosexuals and homosexuals were "slanted in the way a Freudian would expect", adding that many other studies have pointed to very similar conclusions. Ruse argued that there is much to support Bell et al.′s conclusion that Freudian explanations of homosexuality confuse the direction of cause and effect and that the cold and distant relationships gay men report having with their fathers are a result of parental reactions to effeminate or sensitive sons. However, he noted that the accuracy of Bell et al.′s findings is open to doubt for many reasons: their subjects could have been unwittingly giving them the answers they wanted to hear, failed to remember accurately, or suppressed painful childhood memories. The ethologist Irenäus Eibl-Eibesfeldt stated that modern medicine was rejecting psychoanalytic theories about the origins of homosexuality, pointing to Bell et al.′s conclusion that "pure homosexuals can scarcely be modified by their environment whereas bisexuals are accessible with social learning" as an example of this process.

The psychologist Seymour Fisher described Sexual Preference as a high quality study. He argued that Bell et al.′s findings support some of Freud's predictions about how homosexual men view their parents, writing that despite their claim that there is no strong connection, the "negative father" factor had a detectable impact on "gender nonconformity and early homosexual experience" for men. He maintained that they provided no information that could be used to evaluate Freud's vague statements concerning how homosexual women would perceive their mothers, but that their data does support his expectation that they would perceive their fathers in negative terms, despite their deliberately minimizing the overall importance of the father factor in the development of female homosexuality. He viewed their findings about lesbianism as especially significant since their study was published in 1981 and had a large diverse sample. He argued that their finding that recalled patterns of relationships with mother and father predicted homosexual preferences during adolescence, but not the likelihood of being primarily homosexual as an adult, could be explained by the fact that only some of those willing to engage in homosexual sex during their earlier years are able to do so as they leave adolescence, which might make it more difficult to find correlations between early parent-child relationships and "later overt homosexuality."

The neuropsychologist Marshall Kirk and Hunter Madsen described Sexual Preference as a "pathbreaking study" which shows that parents are not "to blame for their 'sexually messed up' children".

Other evaluations, 1990–1997
The philosopher Edward Stein maintained that Bell et al.′s data undermine the hypothesis that a person's sexual orientation is determined by the sex of the first person he or she has sex with. Gonsiorek and Weinrich maintained that Bell et al.′s view that sexual orientation is set by early childhood is also held by most other experts on the topic, including Green and Money. They described Bell et al. as "essentialists", who, unlike supporters of social constructionism, maintain that "homosexual desire, identity, and persons exist as real in some form, in different cultures and historical eras". Gonsiorek and Douglas C. Haldeman both credited Bell et al. with disproving psychoanalytic theories about the development of homosexuality. The economist Richard Posner credited Bell et al. with providing evidence that "childhood gender nonconformity is a good predictor of both male and female homosexuality". He also believed that they showed that boys are not more likely to become homosexual the more adult siblings they have, and provided evidence against the idea that adult homosexuality results from seduction or early homosexual experiences.

The psychologist Kenneth Zucker and the psychiatrist Susan Bradley described Sexual Preference as a "classic study". They maintained that its data, including its finding that "detached-hostile father" is relatively characteristic of a majority of the white homosexual men in their study and a minority of white heterosexual men, are consistent with those of previous clinical research, including Bieber et al.′s study. They wrote that the psychoanalytic perspective that views homosexuality as a mental disorder and explains it in terms of family dynamics influenced the way in which Bell et al. conducted their inquiry, and that Sexual Preference must be understood in the context of sexual politics. They suggested that because homosexuality had been delisted as a mental disorder for eight years by the time the book was published, Bell et al. faced a problem if their data "showed a departure from an ideal of optimal functioning in homosexual men". They argued that, because of their concern for homosexuals, and also influenced by political correctness, Bell et al. deliberately minimized the "observed significant effects" shown by their study, though they noted that this was also in part an objective interpretation of weak effects. They wrote that prior to Bell et al.′s study, researchers were aware that phenomena usually interpreted as parents influencing their children could be interpreted instead as the reverse, and that Bell et al. recognized that "the direction of effects" was a "problematic aspect of their research design". In their view, resolving the "direction-of-effects issue" raised by Bell et al. through retrospective studies comparing homosexual with heterosexual men will be difficult, and that until then the issue will remain "a matter of theoretical taste."

The philosopher Timothy F. Murphy described Sexual Preference as an important study of homosexuality, adding that despite its limitations and flaws, it, like the Kinsey Reports and Homosexualities, should be considered a useful part of a scientific process of "measuring the adequacy of hypotheses and evidence". John Heidenry suggested that Sexual Preference was the most important book on sexuality published in the early 1980s. He wrote that Bell et al. "analyzed every known hypothesis, idea, or suggestion about the origins of homosexuality and found most of them were wrong." He credited them with avoiding the biases of many previous studies, which had drawn their samples from unrepresentative sources such as psychotherapy patients or prison populations, but noted that they failed to identify the cause of homosexuality. He observed that their suggestion that homosexuality may have a biological basis placed them in opposition to Kinsey's views, and that they ignored research that correlated the origins of same-sex preference with factors such as time of puberty, the amount of early sex, and masturbatory patterns.

Other evaluations, 1998–present
The anthropologist Gilbert Herdt argued that Sexual Preference, like the Kinsey scale, places "too much emphasis upon discrete acts of sex and not enough stress upon the cultural context and total developmental outcomes to which those acts are related." He called the study a "quantitative sociological" survey of homosexuality that decontextualizes "the culture and lives at issue", arguing that all developmental changes need to be viewed in the context of social structure. Stein described Sexual Preference as one of the most detailed and frequently cited retrospective studies relating to sexual orientation. In his view, while the study has been criticized on various grounds, including that all of its subjects were living in San Francisco, arguably an atypical place with respect to the sexual orientation of its inhabitants, Bell et al.′s conclusions about theories attributing sexual orientation to the effects of experience have been accepted and confirmed. He observed that many other studies have been conducted on childhood gender nonconformity partly because of Bell et al.′s findings relating it to homosexuality.

The psychologists Stanton L. Jones and Mark Yarhouse described Sexual Preference as a famous study. They maintained that because Bell et al.′s data suggest that mothers have only a weak influence on the development of homosexuality their work is "sometimes thought of as the study that discredited the psychoanalytic theory." However, they observed that in Bell et al.′s sample "considerably more homosexual males reported fathers who were detached or not affectionate than did heterosexual men", and concluded that, "While clearly not providing definitive support for the psychoanalytic hypothesis, this study is surely not the refutation of that hypothesis that it is sometimes supposed to be." The historian Laurie Guy observed that the type of evidence on which Sexual Preference relied, adult recollection of childhood, had been criticized by Gagnon and Simon as long ago as 1973. He argued that gay rights organizations in New Zealand over-relied upon the work in the debate that preceded the passage of the Homosexual Law Reform Act 1986, writing that while important, it was only one study, and as such did not support gay rights activist claims that "all evidence" shows that sexual orientation is fixed early in life.

Judith A. Allen and her co-authors wrote that Sexual Preference, like Homosexualities, abandoned Kinsey's understanding of human sexuality by focusing on homosexual people rather than homosexual behavior and rejecting the idea that categorizing people as homosexual was problematic.

Position of the American Psychological Association
The American Psychological Association, in "Appropriate Therapeutic Responses to Sexual Orientation", a document released in 2009, credited Bell et al. and other authors with discrediting theories claiming that sexual orientation is caused by family dynamics or trauma.

See also

Books
 Gay Science
 Homosexuality: A Philosophical Inquiry
 Male Homosexuality in Four Societies
 Sexuality and Its Discontents

Topics
 Biology and sexual orientation
 Environment and sexual orientation
 Gender variance
 Sigmund Freud's views on homosexuality

References

Bibliography
Books

 
 
 
 
 
 
 
 
 
 
 
 
 
 
 
 
 
 
 
 
 
 
 
 
 
 
 
 
 
 
 
 

Journals

 
 
 
 
 
  
 
  
 
 
  
  
 
 
 
  
 
 
 
  
 
 
 
  
 
 
 
  
 

Online articles

External links
Clarence Tripp's review of Sexual Preference

1981 non-fiction books
American non-fiction books
Books by Alan P. Bell
Books by Martin S. Weinberg
English-language books
Indiana University Press books
Non-fiction books about sexuality
Psychology books
Sociology books
Collaborative non-fiction books